Clerus mutillarius is a species of beetles in the subfamily Clerinae.

References 

 
 

Beetles described in 1775
Taxa named by Johan Christian Fabricius
Clerinae